Carlos Vilar (1930–2021), was an Argentine Snipe sailor.

Carlos Vilar may also refer to:

Carlos Alcántara Vilar (born 1964), Peruvian stand-up comedian and actor
Carlos Vilar, architect on HSBC Bank Argentina

See also
Carlos Villar Turrau, Spanish general
Carlos Villar, character in Safe House (2012 film)